Shalabi Effect is the eponymous debut album of Shalabi Effect. The album cover is taken from the famous Eagle Nebula Pillars of Creation photo made by NASA's Hubble Space Telescope. The album began with the song "Aural Florida", which was originally going to be on a split release with Godspeed You! Black Emperor; when that release was abandoned, the rest of the album was created.

Track listing

Disc One
 "Wyoming" – 11:52
 "Vicious Triangle" – 9:47
 "Mending Holes in a Wooden Heart" – 7:02
 "Aural Florida (Approach)" – 10:00
 "Aural Florida" – 26:37

Disc Two
 "Mokoondi" – 12:57
 "Amber Pets" – 7:55
 "Boardwalk at Apollo Beach" – 6:10
 "Apparitions" – 5:43
 "On the Bowery" – 13:01
 "Leaving a Horse to Die" – 5:03
 "Return to Wake Island" – 9:03
 "ﺍﻠﻮﺮﺪﺓ ﺍﻠﺑﻴﻀﺎﺀ" (Arabic: "White Rose") – 6:04

References 

Shalabi Effect albums
2000 debut albums
Alien8 Recordings albums